Suzanne Marie "Suzy" Semanick (born May 18, 1967 in Bridgeville, Pennsylvania) is an American former figure skater. She competed in ice dance at the 1988 Winter Olympics with Scott Gregory. The pair won the gold medal at the U.S. Figure Skating Championships twice. She later paired with Ron Kravette and won two bronze medals at the United States Figure Skating Championships.  She is now a coach and choreographer in Newark, Delaware and Aston, Pennsylvania.

Results

With Alexander Miller

With Scott Gregory

With Ron Kravette

References

Navigation

1967 births
Living people
People from Bridgeville, Pennsylvania
American female ice dancers
Olympic figure skaters of the United States
Figure skaters at the 1988 Winter Olympics
21st-century American women